The Bikini state was an alert state indicator previously used by the UK Ministry of Defence to warn of non-specific forms of threat, including civil disorder, terrorism or war. Signs giving the current alert state were displayed at the entrance to government buildings and military installations.  It was established on 19 May 1970. According to the Ministry of Defence, the word "bikini" was randomly selected by a computer.

Whilst similar to the DEFCON (defence readiness condition) alert states used in the United States, the Bikini levels were defined by the section of the military or organisation rather than UK-wide, and as a result, countermeasures and reactions to differing states may differ as acutely as from building to building. The highest levels of alert, Red and Amber, were only intended to be maintained for limited times. The White state has rarely been used, and is only known to have been used for periods between the Good Friday Agreement and 9 September 2001.

The system was illustrated in the British television drama Threads, produced by the BBC in 1984.

It was replaced by a more general and public terrorism alert status, the UK Threat Levels, an alert state system in use by the British government since 1 August 2006.

Bikini alert states

NATO military alert state
In addition to Bikini alerts that applied to individual installation NATO had a "Counter-Surprise" Military Alert System to mobilise its military forces.

See also

 Handel (warning system) UK Cold War warning system
 UK Threat Levels
 Homeland Security Advisory System (United States)
 Vigipirate (France)

References

External links
UK Counter-terrorism site, showing current threat level
(Redacted) Memorandum by the Ministry of Defence on Defence and Security in the UK (January 2002) discussing Bikini states
 Note: Annex D referred to in the above is redacted in its entirety
A (redacted) Examination of Witnesses in the Select Committee on Defence discussing the costs of changes to Bikini states
Threat Levels: The System to Assess the Threat from International Terrorism

Alert measurement systems
Emergency management in the United Kingdom
Counterterrorism in the United Kingdom
1970 establishments in the United Kingdom
1970 in military history